The Mazatec Shamans are known for their ritual use of psilocybin mushrooms, psychoactive morning glory seeds, and Salvia divinorum. María Sabina was one of the best known of the Mazatec Shamans. Her healing psilocybin mushroom ceremonies, called veladas, contributed to the popularization of indigenous Mexican ritual use of entheogenic mushrooms among westerners.

In their rituals, Mazatec shamans use fresh Salvia divinorum leaves. Ritual use traditionally involves being in a quiet place after ingestion of the leaf—the Maztec shamans say that "La Maria (S. divinorum) speaks with a quiet voice."

There is little information concerning the Mazatec people generally before the arrival of the Spanish and less concerning their spiritual practices.

Several researchers have commented on the difficulty in obtaining information, as the Mazatec shamans tend to be secretive and protective of their practices.

References

External links 
 Ethnopharmacology of Ska María Pastora 
 In Search of the Magic Plant "Ska Maria Pastora" in the Mazatec Country
 Early History of Salvia Divinorum 

Shamanism of the Americas
Entheogens